The 2020 Japanese Super Formula Championship was the forty-eighth season of premier Japanese open-wheel motor racing, and the eighth under the moniker of Super Formula.

Teams and drivers

Team changes
Ryo Michigami's Drago Corse returns to the championship in partnership with ThreeBond. This marks the team's first appearance in the championship since 2016.
Team LeMans left the championship at the end of 2019. This means that 2020 was the first season since 1988 where Team LeMans was not represented. Their place was filled by KCMG and Cerumo Motorsport which both added one car each. Cerumo's third car was entered as ROOKIE Racing.
Real Racing announced it has withdrawn from the 2020 season.

Driver changes

Toyota
2019 Japanese Formula 3 Champion Sacha Fenestraz replaces Yuji Kunimoto at Kondō Racing. Kunimoto will drive the newly acquired second car at Team KCMG.
Following the departure of Team LeMans, Kazuya Oshima moved to Cerumo Motorsport and will drive the #14 ROOKIE Racing entry.

Honda
Tatiana Calderón moves to the revived Drago Corse team from the FIA Formula 2 Championship, becoming the first female driver in the current Super Formula era and the first in top level Japanese open-wheel racing since Ireland's Sarah Kavanagh entered two races in the 1997 Formula Nippon Championship.
Jüri Vips was scheduled to contest the full season with Team Mugen, having joined the team at the final round of the 2019 Championship as a replacement for Patricio O'Ward. Vips missed the opening rounds at Motegi and Okayama due to his participation in the FIA Formula 2 Championship, and was replaced by Ukyo Sasahara on both occasions. Pandemic-related travel issues further prevented Vips from arriving in Japan, so Sasahara again filled in at Sportsland Sugo. Ahead of the fourth round at Autopolis, it was announced that Sasahara would keep the seat for the remainder of the season.
Pietro Fittipaldi was initially confirmed in the #50 B-MAX entry. Fittipaldi had previously competed in the first round of the 2018 Championship before an injury prevented his return. However, on the eve of a pre-season test at Fuji Speedway, it was announced that Sérgio Sette Câmara would instead occupy the seat, in what was described as a "late reshuffle of race seats due to conflicting sponsors' interests". Sette Câmara will be joined by Charles Milesi, who moves up from the Japanese Formula 3 Championship. B-Max's 2019 drivers Lucas Auer and Harrison Newey left the series, both moving to the DTM with BMW and Audi respectively. Neither driver raced at Motegi with Teppei Natori driving the sole B-Max Dallara.
Alex Palou left Nakajima Racing to move to IndyCar with Dale Coyne Racing. He was replaced by Japanese F3 and Euroformula Open race winner Toshiki Oyu.

Pandemic-related

Five drivers who participated in Round 1 were not eligible to participate in Round 2 at Okayama because the event occurred seven days after the 24 Heures du Mans: Calderón, Kobayashi, Nakajima, Yamashita, Milesi.

Race calendar
The provisional calendar with seven rounds was announced in July 2019. However, in September 2019 the calendar was updated to have the Suzuka Circuit as the first round rather than the Fuji Speedway. The final round at Suzuka Circuit was pushed back 2 weeks to avoid a schedule conflict with the FIA World Endurance Championship, which competes at Fuji Speedway on 1 November. After multiple postponements due to the COVID-19 pandemic, a revised calendar was announced on 9 June 2020 that now sees the season starting in August and running until December.

 On 2 March 2020, the season opener at Suzuka Circuit was postponed due to the coronavirus pandemic. On 7 April 2020, it was announced that the season finale would become a double-header, effectively reestablishing the second round at Suzuka.
 The rounds at Fuji Speedway and Autopolis were postponed on 18 March 2020 and 31 March 2020 respectively, both also because of the virus.
On 24 April 2020, the former fourth round at Sportsland SUGO was also postponed to a so far unannounced date because of the ongoing pandemic.

Results

Season summary

Championship standings

Scoring system
For the 2020 season, the points system has been overhauled to be more in-line with Super GT. The final points standings only include the five best results. Additionally, bonus points are no longer available for the final race of the season. Points are also given to the top three drivers of qualifying as opposed to just points for pole position. Note that these qualifying points do not count towards the teams' championship.

Race points

Qualifying points

Drivers' Championship

Teams' Championship

References

External links
Japanese Championship Super Formula official website 

2020
Super Formula
Super Formula
Super Formula Championship